Obligatory Baháʼí prayers are prayers which are to be said daily by Baháʼís according to a fixed form decreed by Baháʼu'lláh. Prayers in the Baháʼí Faith are reverent words which are addressed to God, and refers to two distinct concepts: obligatory prayer and devotional prayer (general prayer). The act of prayer is one of the most important Baháʼí laws for individual discipline. Along with fasting, obligatory prayer is one of the greatest obligations of a Baháʼí, and the purpose of the obligatory prayer is to foster the development of humility and devotion. The obligation of daily obligatory prayer was prescribed by Baháʼu'lláh, the founder of the Baháʼí Faith, in his book of laws, the Kitáb-i-Aqdas.

It is forbidden to perform the obligatory prayers in congregation, so the daily obligatory prayers are offered individually, though it is not required that they be said in private.

History 
In the Bayán the Báb prescribed an obligatory prayer  of the nineteen  rak'ah (prostrations). He never wrote the text of this prayer, making the implementation of this law dependent on the coming of the Promised One. The Báb explained that the prayer symbolizes a spiritual journey from the realm of the body to the realm of the heart, which can be described as an arc of ascent, mirroring the arc of descent from God to creation. 

In the Kitáb-i-Aqdas, Baháʼu'lláh confirmed the law of daily obligatory prayer and wrote that the specific obligatory prayer was recorded in a separate tablet or writing. Baháʼu'lláh wrote the text mentioned, but never released it in order to avoid provoking conflict with Muslims. Instead, sometime before the writing of the supplement to the Kitáb-i-Aqdas, the Questions and Answers, Baháʼu'lláh wrote a set of three obligatory prayers which are the ones used by Baháʼís today.  The original obligatory prayer involved nine rak'ah and was to be said in the morning, noon and in the afternoon, probably three cycles at a time. After Baháʼu'lláh's death a strongbox holding the text of the original obligatory prayer was stolen by Mírzá Muhammad ʻAlí.

Significance 
The obligatory prayer is a primary religious obligation starting at the age of fifteen and it is the most important kind of prayer. The purpose of the obligatory prayer is to foster the development of humility and devotion.  The Baháʼí writings strongly warn against neglecting the prayers or minimizing their importance.  The obligatory prayers are a personal spiritual obligation, and failure to observe the law is seen to have only a spiritual penalty.

Current prayers 

Unlike general prayers in the Baháʼí Faith, there are specific regulations concerning the obligatory prayers; however, obligatory prayer is a personal spiritual obligation and thus no Baháʼí administrative sanction can be obtained if a Baháʼí fails to say his prayer daily.

Baháʼu'lláh wrote three obligatory prayers — the short, the medium and the long — and Baháʼís are free to choose to say one of the three each day.  The short and the medium prayer have to be said at specific times; the short has to be said once between noon and sunset and the medium has to be said three times daily: once between dawn and noon, once between noon and sunset and once between sunset and two hours after sunset. The long prayer can be said at any time in the day. The medium and long prayers also include movements and gestures during the prayers, which are themselves obligatory except when a person is physically incapable of performing them. Shoghi Effendi has written that the motions and gestures are symbolic and are used to help maintain concentration during the prayers. Furthermore, the obligatory prayer is to be preceded by ablutions, the cleaning of the hands and face, and one has to face the Qiblih, which is the Shrine of Baháʼu'lláh.

Short prayer 
The short prayer is a brief affirmation of the power of God and the servitude of the worshipper.  The prayer should be said while standing in an attitude of humility before God, and it should be said between noon and sunset. The text of the prayer is:

"I bear witness, O my God, that Thou hast created me to know Thee and to worship Thee. I testify, at this moment, to my powerlessness and to Thy might, to my poverty and to Thy wealth.  There is none other God but Thee, the Help in Peril, the Self-Subsisting."

Medium prayer 
The medium obligatory prayer must be said three times during the day: once between sunrise and noon, once between noon and sunset, and once after sunset till two hours after sunset. It includes a series of positions and movements from one position to the next, along with specific supplications. The prayer stresses the power and loftiness of God, and the grace that is shown through his revelation. The text of the medium obligatory prayer can be found in Baháʼu'lláh's Prayers and Meditations.

Long prayer 
The long obligatory prayer can be said anytime during the day. It includes a series of positions and movements from one position to the next, along with specific supplications. The prayer also includes parts where says the Greatest Name of God in the form of "Allah-u-Abha" at several points. About this prayer, Baháʼu'lláh has stated: "...the long Obligatory Prayer should be said at those times when one feeleth himself in a prayerful mood. In truth, it hath been revealed in such wise that if it be recited to a rock, that rock would stir and speak forth; and if it be recited to a mountain, that mountain would move and flow. Well is it with the one who reciteth it and fulfilleth God's precepts. Whichever prayer is read will suffice." The text of the long obligatory prayer can be found in Baháʼu'lláh's Prayers and Meditations. This prayer is known in Arabic as salat and as namaz in Persian, and is similar to the Islamic salat.

Laws 
There are a number of laws and practices associated with the obligatory prayers concerning how to say the obligatory prayer, when Baháʼís are exempt from saying the obligatory prayers, and what to do if one misses saying an obligatory prayer.

Practices 
There are certain practices that must be associated with the saying of the obligatory prayers.  They include performing ablution, which consist of washing the hands and face, before the obligatory prayer.  In the case that water is unavailable, or its use harmful to the face or hands, the verse "In the Name of God, the Most Pure, the Most Pure" should be repeated five times.  The prayer should be said while the reader is facing the Qiblih which is the Shrine of Baháʼu'lláh. It is also preferable for the reader to be standing while saying the obligatory prayers in an attitude of humble reverence. Baháʼí's are also obliged to repeat the Greatest Name (Alláh-u-Abhá) 95 times a day while sitting. Ablutions are also prescribed for this, but it is not necessary to do them again if the repetitions are done right after the daily obligatory prayer.

Exemptions 
Exemptions from saying the obligatory prayer include:
Children under the age of 15.
Those that are of ill-health.
Those that are older than 70.
Women who are menstruating are exempt from saying their obligatory prayer. They should instead perform their ablutions and repeat the verse "Glorified be God, the Lord of Splendour and Beauty" ninety-five times.

Missed prayers 
In the case of a missed prayer due to insecurity such as during travel, each missed prayer can be compensated for by the repetition of certain verses and movements. The person should perform a single prostration (laying the forehead on any clean surface) in the place of each unsaid obligatory prayer and the prostrations should be performed while saying the verse "Glorified be God, the Lord of Might and Majesty, of Grace and Bounty."  The prostrations should then be followed by saying the verse "Glorified be God, the Lord of the kingdoms of earth and heaven" eighteen times while the person is sitting cross-legged.

Obligatory prayer for the departed
Baháʼu'lláh wrote also a specific prayer for the dead, known as the Obligatory prayer for the departed, which is an unrelated practice, despite the similarity in terminology. This prayer is to be said before the interment of a Baháʼí who has reached the age of fifteen. It is a congregational prayer: the words are read aloud by a single person while others who are present stand in silence.

Notes

References

Further reading
 Velasco, Ismael (2006), Entering into Obligatory Prayer: Introduction and Commentary.

External links 
The Obligatory Prayers on bahai.org
Short Obligatory Prayer in many languages
 The Short Obligatory Prayer recited in Arabic and subtitled in the world’s languages - The Utterance Project 
 Long Obligatory Prayer: Printable, Foldable Version, in many languages
 Transliteration of the Long Obligatory Prayer in Arabic
Compendium on Bahá'í Obligatory Prayers
 "The Long Obligatory Prayer" - A Talk by Ali Nakhjavani

Bahá'í prayer